Lancelot Gerald Hemus (13 November 1881 – 27 October 1933) was a New Zealand cricketer. He played 46 first-class matches for Auckland between 1904 and 1922.

An opening batsman, in 1907-08 Hemus scored the first century in the Plunket Shield when Auckland beat Canterbury to claim the Shield. By his last season, 1921–22, when Auckland again won the Shield, he was the highest scorer in the competition's history. When the cricket historian Tom Reese chose the best New Zealand team of all time in 1936, he named Hemus as one of the opening batsmen.

He died of pneumonia in 1933, leaving a widow, a son and three daughters.

See also
 List of Auckland representative cricketers

References

External links
 

1881 births
1933 deaths
New Zealand cricketers
Pre-1930 New Zealand representative cricketers
Auckland cricketers
Cricketers from Auckland
Deaths from pneumonia in New Zealand